Garnett John-Peter Kruger (born 5 January 1977) is a South African cricketer. Kruger started his first-class cricket career in 1997–98 for Eastern Province B, moving up to the A team in 1999–2000. In 2003–04 he played for Gauteng, before moving to the Lions on the reorganisation of South African first-class cricket in 2004–05. Although he was called to the Test side in 2003–04, he did not make the final team. In 2005–06 he made his debut as an international cricketer, in the one-off Twenty20 International against Australia, and he also played in three One Day Internationals on the same tour.

Kruger represented English side Leicestershire in the 2007 and 2008 seasons as a Kolpak player and performed well in leading a young bowling attack. Kruger left the county at the end of the 2008 season claiming he was concerned about the workload of playing domestic cricket all year around. However, in December 2008 he signed for Glamorgan, becoming the county's first Kolpak player.

In the past Kruger has been heavily critical of SA Cricket.

References

External links

1977 births
Living people
South African cricketers
Eastern Province cricketers
Gauteng cricketers
Leicestershire cricketers
Glamorgan cricketers
Lions cricketers
South Africa Twenty20 International cricketers
South Africa One Day International cricketers
Cricketers from Port Elizabeth